The yellow moray (Gymnothorax prasinus) is a moray eel of the genus Gymnothorax, found in southern Australia and between North Cape and the Māhia Peninsula on the North Island of New Zealand.

References
 
 
 Tony Ayling & Geoffrey Cox, Collins Guide to the Sea Fishes of New Zealand,  (William Collins Publishers Ltd, Auckland, New Zealand 1982) 

yellow moray
Marine fish of Southern Australia
Fish of the North Island
yellow moray